Immunomodulation is modulation (regulatory adjustment) of the immune system. It has natural and human-induced forms, and thus the word can refer to the following:

 Homeostasis in the immune system, whereby the system self-regulates to adjust immune responses to adaptive rather than maladaptive levels (using regulatory T cells, cell signaling molecules, and so forth)
 Immunomodulation as part of immunotherapy, in which immune responses are induced, amplified, attenuated, or prevented according to therapeutic goals

See also 

 Immunomodulation in osseointegration

Immune system process
Immunology